People of the Sea may refer to:

 People of the Sea (novel), a 1993 novel in the First North Americans series
 People of the Sea (film), a 1925 German silent drama film